Tinashe is a Shona given name, popular in Zimbabwe and amongst Zimbabwean expatriates. It is a unisex name. People with the name include several sportspeople:

 Tinashe Chimbambo (born 1989), Zimbabwean cricketer
 Tinashe Hove (born 1984), Zimbabwean cricketer
 Tinashe Mhora (born 1991), Zimbabwean cricketer
 Tinashe Mutanga (born 1993), Zimbabwean sprinter
 Tinashe Nengomasha (born 1982), Zimbabwean association footballer
 Tinashe Panyangara (born 1985), Zimbabwean international cricketer
 Tinashe Ruswa (born 1985), Zimbabwean cricketer
 Tinashe Mapfumo (born 1989), Zimbabwean engineer

The name is also used mononymously by:

 Tinashe (born 1993), an American singer and actress
 Tinashé (born 1984), a British musician

Feminine given names
Shona given names
Unisex given names